Thévenet is a French surname. Notable people with the surname include:
 Alizee Thévenet (born 1990), French financial analyst, fiancée of James Middleton
 Bernard Thévenet (born 1948), French bicycle racer
Cécile Thévenet (born 1872), Belgian opera singer
 Saint Claudine Thévenet (1774–1837), French religious woman
 Homero Alsina Thévenet (1922–2005), Uruguayan journalist and film critic
 Pierre-Louis Thévenet, American production designer, art director and set decorator
 Virginie Thévenet (born 1955), French actress and director

French-language surnames